Fort Sumner is a village in and the county seat of De Baca County, New Mexico, United States. The population was 1,031 at the 2010 U.S. Census, down from the figure of 1,249 recorded in 2000. Fort Sumner is the spring and fall home of the Columbia Scientific Balloon Facility, and is home to the burial site of famed outlaw of the American West, Billy the Kid, who was shot and killed there in 1881.

History
Named after former New Mexico Territory military governor Edwin Vose Sumner, U.S. Fort Sumner was a military fort charged with the internment of nearby Navajo and Mescalero Apache populations from 1863 to 1868. The federal government closed the fort in 1868 and sold its buildings to Lucien Maxwell, a prominent New Mexico landowner, in 1870. In the latter 1870s Maxwell's son Pete befriended legendary outlaw Billy the Kid, and it was in his house that Billy was killed by Pat Garrett. Billy the Kid is buried in the old military cemetery in Fort Sumner, as is Lucien Maxwell.

In 1866, the U.S. government was holding thousands of Native American Indians at Fort Sumner after they were subdued by Kit Carson. Charles Goodnight and Oliver Loving saw a business opportunity and decided to sell beef to the United States Government so that the captive, displaced, and imprisoned Native Americans could be fed. This enterprise led to the establishment of the Goodnight-Loving Trail, located far enough west to avoid any contact with mobs wanting the superior Longhorn cattle.

In the 1920s the Transcontinental Air Transport airline built an airfield in Fort Sumner as part of its coast-to-coast air passenger network, but the site was abandoned when the airline's ambitious plans collapsed in the Great Depression. The airfield was reopened by the United States Army Air Forces as a training base during World War II. After the war, the base became the Fort Sumner Municipal Airport, and was chosen as a launch site for NASA's high-altitude balloon program (see Columbia Scientific Balloon Facility).

Geography and climate

U.S. Route 60 passes through the village as Sumner Avenue, leading east  to Clovis and west  to Vaughn. U.S. Route 84 comes in from the north as 4th Street, leading northwest  to Santa Rosa. US 84 runs east from Fort Sumner with US 60 to Clovis and the Texas border beyond it.

Demographics

As of the census of 2000, there were 1,249 people, 533 households, and 312 families residing in the village. The population density was 374.6 people per square mile (144.8/km2). There were 680 housing units at an average density of 204.0 per square mile (78.8/km2). The racial makeup of the village was 81.91% White, 0.80% Native American, 0.08% Asian, 15.29% from other races, and 1.92% from two or more races. Hispanic or Latino of any race were 48.28% of the population.

There were 533 households, out of which 22.9% had children under the age of 18 living with them, 45.8% were married couples living together, 9.4% had a female householder with no husband present, and 41.3% were non-families. 38.6% of all households were made up of individuals, and 23.3% had someone living alone who was 65 years of age or older. The average household size was 2.21 and the average family size was 2.97.

In the village, the population was spread out, with 22.4% under the age of 18, 5.6% from 18 to 24, 21.2% from 25 to 44, 19.5% from 45 to 64, and 31.3% who were 65 years of age or older. The median age was 46 years. For every 100 females, there were 92.4 males. For every 100 females age 18 and over, there were 86.3 males.

The median income for a household in the village was $19,583, and the median income for a family was $28,625. Males had a median income of $24,722 versus $16,953 for females. The per capita income for the village was $13,327. About 20.4% of families and 25.3% of the population were below the poverty line, including 33.9% of those under age 18 and 17.1% of those age 65 or over.

Education
Fort Sumner Municipal Schools is the school district of all of De Baca County.

In popular culture
Fort Sumner is featured in the video game, American Truck Simulator.
Fort Sumner was also featured in Episode 11, 02/11/1958, of the Western television show, Cheyenne (starring Clint Walker), highlighting the U.S. Army's attempt to control Comanche indigenous peoples after the Civil War.

See also

 List of municipalities in New Mexico

References

External links

 Fort Sumner Chamber of Commerce
 History of the stratospheric balloon research made at Fort Sumner

Villages in De Baca County, New Mexico
County seats in New Mexico
Villages in New Mexico
National Register of Historic Places in De Baca County, New Mexico